"'Loving You (Is a Way of Life)" is a song recorded by New Zealand singer-songwriter, Jon Stevens. The song was produced by Steve Robinson. It was released in June 1980 as Stevens' fourth single and peaked at number 28 in New Zealand.

The track is not included on his debut album, Jezebel, however the B-side track, "The Honeymoon is Over" is.

Track listing
 Vinyl, 7", 45 RPM
 "Loving You (Is a Way of Life)"	
 "The Honeymoon is Over"

Charts

References

1980 singles
1980 songs
Jon Stevens songs
CBS Records singles
Songs written by Tom Snow
Songs written by Franne Golde
Songs written by Albert Hammond